The Gamma Normids (GNO) are a weak meteor shower, active from March 7 to 23, peaking on March 15. The radiant is located near the star Gamma2 Normae in the constellation Norma.

History

The first observations were made by R A McIntosh from Auckland, New Zealand in 1929, with confirmation coming from observations made by M. Geddes in 1932. The shower was virtually ignored until radar equipment used by A A Weiss in Adelaide, South Australia detected activity 15–16 March 1953. An attempt to observe the shower with radar in 1956 was unsuccessful, however the shower was observed again with radar in 1969.

Members of the Western Australia Meteor Section made extensive observations in the 1970s and 1980s. In 1983 the average magnitude of the 63 meteors was 2.68 and 9.5% had trains with the highest Zenithal Hourly Rate (ZHR) of 9.6±2.3 recorded on the night of March 13/14 . In 1986 273 meteors were observed, and the highest ZHR (3.49) was recorded on March 14/15. Nearly 20% of the meteors left trains.

In 2005 the Liga IberoAmericana De Astronomía noted meteors from this stream every night during the observation period of March 8–17. The highest number of meteors seen was 5, on the night of March 10/11 with a ZHR of 14 ± 6.

References

Meteor showers
March events